Red Park is an unincorporated summer resort area of Onekama Township, Manistee County in the U.S. state of Michigan.

History
Red Park was established in the early 1900s by a man named Davis as a summer resort colony for people in Manistee, Michigan. The original resort consisted of a small store operated by Mr. and Mrs. James Sandenberg, the only permanent residents, who also acted as the caretaker of the collection of small summer cottages. A bandstand was built in the center of the resort, before 1910.

Early summer residents
Among the earliest summer residents of this area were the following families:
 Cron
 Probeck
 Shaw
 Hollowed
Sands

References

 Heidi Berg, "Red Park," in Wellspring: Interesting interviews... The way things were... (Manistee: J.B. Publications, 1992), vol. 2, pp. 30–33.

Unincorporated communities in Manistee County, Michigan
Unincorporated communities in Michigan